Maria Margaronis (born 1958 in Marylebone, London) is a British journalist of Greek descent.

Margaronis has written from The Nation’s London bureau, the other half of which was her husband D. D. Guttenplan, now The Nations  editor. A former associate literary editor of the magazine, her work has appeared in many other publications, including The Guardian, the London Review of Books, The Times Literary Supplement and The New York Times. She writes and presents radio documentaries for the BBC.

Of Greek descent, in recent years she has been immersed in the Greek crisis, speaking and broadcasting as well as writing about it for many different audiences. She teaches writing part-time to historians at Birkbeck, translates modern Greek poetry, and is a trustee of the charity Women for Refugee Women.

References

External links
 Twitter

1958 births
Living people
Journalists from London
People from Marylebone